The 2011 Jalisco Open was a professional tennis tournament played on hard courts. It was the first edition of the tournament which is part of the 2011 ATP Challenger Tour. It took place in Guadalajara, Mexico between 20 and 26 June 2011.

Singles main-draw entrants

Seeds

 1 Rankings are as of June 13, 2011.

Other entrants
The following players received wildcards into the singles main draw:
  Miguel Gallardo-Vallés
  Luis Patiño
  Manuel Sánchez
  Júlio César Vázquez

The following players received entry from the qualifying draw:
  Luis Díaz Barriga
  Juan Sebastián Gómez
  Ruben Gonzales
  Miguel Ángel Reyes-Varela

The following players received entry as a lucky loser into the singles main draw:
  Pierre-Ludovic Duclos

Champions

Singles

 Paul Capdeville def.  Pierre-Ludovic Duclos, 7–5, 6–1

Doubles

 Vasek Pospisil /  Bobby Reynolds def.  Pierre-Ludovic Duclos /  Ivo Klec, 6–4, 6–7(6), [10–6]

External links
Official website
ITF Search 
ATP official site

Jalisco Open
Jalisco Open
2011 in Mexican tennis